This is a list of corporations that have pleaded guilty to, no contest to, or been convicted of a felony offense or multiple felonies in a state or federal court within the United States, and not had the conviction(s) overturned on appeal.

Companies convicted of felonies in the United States

Archer Daniels Midland
BAE Systems, pleaded guilty to conspiring to defraud the US by impairing and impeding its lawful functions, to make false statements about its Foreign Corrupt Practices Act (FCPA) compliance program, and to violate the Arms Export Control Act (AECA) and International Traffic in Arms Regulations (ITAR).
Bankers Trust
BP, pleaded guilty to 11 counts of felony manslaughter.
British Airways, pleaded guilty for price fixing.
Daiwa Bank
F. Hoffmann-La Roche
General Electric
Hoechst AG
HSBC, pleaded guilty to 4 federal felony counts related to drug laundering for Mexican and Columbian drug cartels.
International Paper
Louisiana Pacific
Pfizer, pleaded guilty to a felony violation of the Food, Drug and Cosmetic Act for misbranding Bextra with the intent to defraud or mislead.
PG&E
Samsung, pleaded guilty to price-fixing.
Sears, Roebuck & Company, pleaded guilty to 1 count of fraud.
The Trump Organization, convicted of tax fraud, scheming to defraud, conspiracy, and falsifying business records.
Tyson Foods
Volkswagen, pleaded guilty to 3 criminal felonies related to its emissions scandal.
Waste Management, Inc

References

Felonious companies
Corporate crime